
Year 61 BC was a year of the pre-Julian Roman calendar. At the time it was known as the Year of the Consulship of Calpurnianus and Messalla (or, less frequently, year 693 Ab urbe condita). The denomination 61 BC for this year has been used since the early medieval period, when the Anno Domini calendar era became the prevalent method in Europe for naming years.

Events 
 By place 

 Roman Republic 
 September 29 – Pompey celebrates his third triumph for victories over the pirates and the end of the Mithridatic Wars.
 Marcus Pupius Piso Frugi as consul attempts to gain ratification of Pompey's Eastern Settlement.
 Julius Caesar becomes governor in Hispania and creates Legio X Gemina (3,500 men). He puts down the Callaici and Lusitani rebellions.

Births

Deaths 
 Quintus Marcius Rex, Roman consul and general

References